"I Am Changing" is a song from the second act of the long-running Broadway musical Dreamgirls. Written by Henry Krieger and Tom Eyen, the song was performed by the character Effie White, originally portrayed on Broadway by Jennifer Holliday.

History
"I Am Changing" tells the story of a woman who wants to leave behind the mistakes of her past and "change her life"—she sings, "I need you, I need a hand" and "I need a friend to help me start all over again". After the unexpected success of Holliday's first single, "And I Am Telling You I'm Not Going", "I Am Changing" was released as the second single from the Dreamgirls cast album.
 
However, the song didn't perform as well as "And I Am Telling You I'm Not Going", peaking at #22 on Billboard's Black Singles Chart and failing to chart on Billboard's Pop Singles Chart.

Cover versions
"I Am Changing" has been covered several times. Whitney Houston performed the song at the 10th Anniversary of Arista Records ceremony in 1984. This performance is included on her 2010 CD/DVD reissue of Whitney Houston – The Deluxe Anniversary Edition.  She also performed the song during the duration of her Greatest Love World Tour in 1986 in a slower, soulful version, influenced by gospel music.

Ex-Supreme Mary Wilson included it in her album Walk the Line, and in a compilation of her solo singles.

Lillias White, who was Holliday's original understudy, has performed the song in concert. Jennifer Hudson performs the song as Effie White in the 2006 DreamWorks/Paramount Dreamgirls motion picture adaptation.

The song was performed by Bianca Ryan on the first season of NBC's America's Got Talent, a reality show which Ryan became the winner of that year. The eleven-year-old's performance of "I Am Changing" prompted show judge (and onetime teen star) Brandy to shake her head and proclaim that Ryan "makes me want to go practice … that's how good you are."

In 2014, the song was performed in the Glee episode "New Directions" by Kurt Hummel (Chris Colfer) and Mercedes Jones (Amber Riley).

Charts

References

1981 songs
1982 singles
Songs from Dreamgirls
Jennifer Hudson songs
Songs written by Henry Krieger
Songs with lyrics by Tom Eyen
Song recordings produced by David Foster